Louis Gosselin (1 October 1879 – 18 June 1954) was a Liberal party member of the House of Commons of Canada. He was born in Saint-Alexandre-d'Iberville, Quebec and became a farmer and lawyer.

Gosselin attended College Sainte-Marie then McGill University, University College London and Collège de la Sorbonne in Paris. He was mayor of Notre-Dame-de-Stanbridge, Quebec at one time.

He was first elected to Parliament at the Brome—Missisquoi riding in the 1935 general election. After completing one term, the 18th Canadian Parliament, Gosselin left federal politics and did not seek another term in the 1940 election.

References

External links
 

1879 births
Alumni of University College London
Canadian farmers
Lawyers in Quebec
Liberal Party of Canada MPs
Mayors of places in Quebec
McGill University alumni
University of Paris alumni
Members of the House of Commons of Canada from Quebec
1954 deaths
Canadian expatriates in France